The Jiading Wetlands is a wetland in Qieding District, Kaohsiung, Taiwan. It provides a winter home to a substantial number of black-faced spoonbills.

History
The wetland was used to be a salt-evaporation pond. In 2011, it was declared a national heritage wetland by the Ministry of the Interior. With the growing popularity of the area for birdwatching, the Kaohsiung City Government decided to construct a road leading to the area in July 2014 to accommodate the increasing number of tourists. In the same year, local residents filed a petition to avoid the construction.

Ecology
In early 2015, the wetland is home to 162 spoonbills, which counted about 8% of the global population.

See also
 Geography of Taiwan

References

2011 establishments in Taiwan
Landforms of Kaohsiung
Wetlands of Taiwan